Kodima is a Veps and Russian-language monthly published in Petrozavodsk, in the Republic of Karelia, which is distributed for free. It’s the only newspaper published in Veps-Language.

History 
The first issue was published in April 1993 by Periodika, which also publishes Karjalan Sanomat, Oma Mua and Vienan Karjala. Nina Zaitseva, a linguist scientist, was the first chief editor.

Marina Giniatullina serves as current chief-editor.

Chief editors
Nina Zaitseva
Irina Sotnikova
Marina Giniatullina

References

External links 
 Kodima

Publications established in 1993
Veps-language newspapers
Russian-language newspapers published in Russia